J K Bajaj (born 21 March 1952 in Punjab, India) is a founding trustee and director of the Center for Policy Studies, Chennai. He is also a member of the Indian Council of Social Science Research, of the National Council of Rural Institutes and of the advisory board, Council for Scientific and Industrial Research. J K Bajaj holds a PhD degree in theoretical physics from Panjab University and has worked extensively in  the scientific and technological tradition of India, Indian ideas and institutions and the  religious demography of India.

After securing PhD degree, J K Bajaj worked as a UGC research associate in the  Department of Theoretical Physics, University of Madras, Chennai during 1978–81, as a research fellow in Philosophy of Science at the Department of Humanities and Social Sciences, Indian Institute of Technology, Bombay during 1981-83 and as a Fellow of the Indian Council of Social Science Research (ICSSR) at Indian Institute of Technology, Bombay, and Centre for the Study of Developing Societies, Delhi during 1983–86. During 1986–87, Bajaj worked as an assistant editor of the Hindi-language daily Jansatta and during 1987-87 worked as its resident editor.

In an effort to understand the tradition of science and technology in India, J K Bajaj along with his colleagues founded the  Patriotic and People-oriented Science and Technology (PPST) Group and the PPST Bulletin at Chennai in 1981. This group and its bulletin became a forum for creating awareness about the Indian tradition of science and technology, especially in medicine, agriculture, mathematics, astronomy and linguistics. In 1990, Bajaj along with some of the colleagues and friends from the PPST Group established the Centre for Policy Studies, with the objective of "comprehending and cherishing the essential civilisational genius of India not only in the matter of science and technology but also in all other fields of thought and organization, and helping in formulating a polity that would allow the Indian people and their genius to flourish and assert themselves in the present day world". Since its founding, Bajaj is serving as its Director.

Books authored/co-authored/edited by J K Bajaj

The books authored/co-authored/edited by J K Bajaj include the following:

Hind Swaraj (2012), based on the original handwritten notes written by Mahatma Gandhi in Gujarati language.
Scheduled Tribes of India: Religious Demography and Representation, ed. Dr. J. K. Bajaj, 2011.
Religious Demography of India, A. P. Joshi, M. D. Srinivas and J. K. Bajaj, Centre for Policy Studies, Chennai, 2003.
Timeless India Resurgent India: A Celebration of the Land and People of India, Jitendra Bajaj and M. D. Srinivas, Centre for Policy Studies, Chennai 2001; also published in Hindi, Centre for Policy Studies, Chennai 2001.
Restoring Abundance: Regeneration of Indian Agriculture to Ensure Food for All in Plenty, J. K. Bajaj and M. D. Srinivas, IIAS, Shimla, 2001.
Food for All, ed. J. K. Bajaj, Centre for Policy Studies, Chennai 2001
Annam Bahu Kurvita: Recollecting the Indian Discipline of Growing and Sharing Food in Plenty, Jitendra Bajaj and M. D. Srinivas, Centre for Policy Studies, Chennai 1996; also published in Hindi 1996, and Tamil 1998.
Ayodhya and the Future India, ed. Jitendra Bajaj, Centre for Policy Studies, Chennai 1993.
Bharatiya Chitta Manas and Kala by Sri Dharampal, tr. and ed. Jitendra Bajaj, Centre for Policy Studies, Chennai 1993.
Indian Economy and Polity, ed. J. K. Bajaj, Centre for Policy Studies (1995).
Resource Atlas of MADHYA PRADESH (English, 2007)

References

External links
 

Theoretical physicists
Indian demographers
Recipients of the Padma Shri in literature & education
Panjab University alumni
1952 births
Living people